Davide Di Quinzio (born 28 April 1989) is an Italian professional footballer who plays as a midfielder for  club Lucchese on loan from Pisa.

Club career
He made his professional Lega Pro Prima Divisione debut for Pro Sesto in the 2008–09 season. He remained in the third-tier Serie C for the first 12 seasons of his senior career.

For the 2019–20 season his club Pisa advanced to the second-tier Serie B.

He made his Serie B debut for Pisa on 24 September 2019 in a game against Empoli. He started the game and was substituted after 65 minutes.

On 15 January 2020, he signed a 2.5-year contract with Serie C club Alessandria.

On 5 August 2021 he returned to Pisa. On 26 August 2022, Di Quinzio was loaned to Lucchese.

References

External links
 

1989 births
Sportspeople from the Metropolitan City of Milan
Footballers from Lombardy
Living people
Italian footballers
S.S.D. Pro Sesto players
U.C. AlbinoLeffe players
A.C. Montichiari players
A.C. Cuneo 1905 players
S.P.A.L. players
Como 1907 players
Pisa S.C. players
U.S. Alessandria Calcio 1912 players
Lucchese 1905 players
Serie B players
Serie C players
Association football midfielders